List of association football clubs in the Philippines sorted by league and division:

Men's

Philippines Football League (2017–Present) 
The Philippines Football League is the national league in the country.

United Football League (2010–16)

Division I (2010–16)

2016 season only
There was only a single division in the 2016 UFL season. The following are clubs which competed that have no prior participation at Division I in previous seasons.

 Agila
 Forza
 JP Voltes
 Laos

Division II (2010–15)

Others 
These are teams that did not compete in the national league, they only made an appearance on the PFF National Club Championship, UFL Cup, or other defunct national leagues.

Bohemian Sporting Club
Carrigans FC
ERCO BRO Nationals
Manila Lions
M'lang
General Trias International
Sunken Garden United
Garuda PH
Flame United F.C.

Women's

PFF Women's League (2016–) 
Clubs
 De La Salle Zobel 
 De La Salle University 
 Far Eastern University 
 Green Archers United
 Nomads 
 Stallion-Hiraya
 Maroons F.C.
 Tigers F.C.
 Tuloy F.C.
 University of Santo Tomas 
 University of the Philippines 
Former Member Teams
 Ateneo de Manila University
 Fuego España F.C.
 Kaya 
 OutKast F.C.
 The Younghusband Football Academy

PFF Women's Cup
 Sikat
 Azzurri F.C.

References

External links
 

Philippines
Clubs
Football clubs